Mutolere is a neighborhood in Kisoro Municipality, Kisoro District, in the Western Region of Uganda.

Location
The geographical coordinates of the Mutolere neighborhood are 01°14'56.0"S, 29°42'49.0"E (Latitude:-1.248889; Longitude:29.713611).

Points of interest
These are some of the points of interest in or near Mutolere:

Mutolere is the location of St. Francis Hospital Mutolere, a 220-bed community hospital, owned and administered by the Roman Catholic Diocese of Kabale. The hospital has an affiliated nurses and midwives school, the Mutolere School of Nursing and Midwifery.

Another institution in the neighborhood is Mutolere Senior Secondary School, (also St. Paul's Secondary School, Mutolere), a residential all-boys middle and high school (grades 8-13). Former students at this school, include Kale Kayihura, the former Inspector General of Police, in the Uganda Police Force and Harrison Mutikanga, the Managing Director of the Uganda Electricity Generation Company Limited. The student body at this school exceed 1,000.

Other establishments in the neighborhood include St. Gertrude Girls School.

See also
 Kale Kayihura
 Sam Bitangaro
 Harrison Mutikanga

References

Kisoro
Kisoro District
Kigezi sub-region
Populated places in Western Region, Uganda
Cities in the Great Rift Valley